From the Album of the Same Name (known as Pilot in the US) is the 1974 debut album by Pilot, containing the international hit "Magic" and the minor hit, "Just a Smile" (UK #31, Australia #49, US #90).

The album was initially released in 1974 by EMI, and later re-released on CD by EMI Japan in 1990 and by C5 Records (Chapter 5 Records), in 1991.

Ian Bairnson plays guitar on this album but, at the time, was not a group member. He joined the group, officially, after it had been recorded. Richard Hewson made the orchestral arrangements.

Track listing
All tracks written by David Paton and Billy Lyall.

Bonus tracks (2009 remaster) 
The album was remastered in 2009 with the following bonus tracks:

Personnel

Pilot
David Paton - lead vocals, bass
Billy Lyall - keyboards, synthesizers, piano, backing vocals
Stuart Tosh - drums, backing vocals

Additional personnel
Ian Bairnson - electric guitar ("Magic" and "High Into the Sky")
Nick Heath - backing vocals
David Mason - trumpet
Richard Hewson - orchestral arrangements

References

External links
[ Pilot information and discography]
General Pilot information

1974 debut albums
Pilot (band) albums
Albums produced by Alan Parsons
EMI Records albums